Marvin Jay Cohen, better known by his broadcast name of Jay Marvin was a retired American liberal radio talk show host and writer.
Former WLS-AM & FM talk show host Jay Marvin has died.  That's according to his wife Mary. Posted on FACEBOOK Chicago's WLS Radio History
Marvin began his radio career in 1971 as a country music DJ at KWMC in Del Rio, Texas. After that, he worked at various stations including WWOD Lynchburg, Virginia, K102 FM El Paso, Texas, WHBQ in Memphis, WJEZ and WJJD Chicago, Illinois, and KKAT Salt Lake City, Utah, and Top 40 station KIXZ in Amarillo, Texas. He switched to talk radio in the late 1980s starting at WTKN St. Petersburg, Florida and then moved to WFLA in Tampa. From there, he moved to WTMJ Milwaukee, Wisconsin, WLS Chicago (twice), and KHOW and KKZN in Denver, Colorado. He has also guest hosted nationally for Ed Schultz, Jerry Springer, and Alan Colmes.

Marvin has interviewed many famous guests on his show, including Howard Dean, John Kerry, Jimmy Carter, and Mike Gravel, as well as other guests and local Colorado politicians including Mark Udall, Bill Ritter, Ed Perlmutter, and Diana DeGette.

In September 2010, Marvin announced his retirement from radio.

Bibliography 

 Punk Blood, 1998
 The White Trash Chronicles, 2001

References

External links 
 Jay Marvin's page on Denver's Progressive Talk Channel (760 AM)

American alternative journalists
American television talk show hosts
People with bipolar disorder
Living people
Year of birth missing (living people)
Radio personalities from Denver
Radio personalities from Tampa, Florida